The Michael Davitt Bridge is a swing bridge in County Mayo, Ireland that crosses from Achill Island to the Mainland.

History
The plan for a bridge to connect Achill Island to the Corraun Peninsula was considered in the early 1880s. A Mayo County surveyor drew up plans, which were approved by J. Price, a civil engineer. The official authorization was received from The Board of Trade in London and in 1883 an administrative body was organized to finance it ; total cost was projected to be approximately £5,000. The costs exceeded the estimates. However, John Grey Vesey Porter of County Fermanagh contributed his personal funds, so that the bridge could be built as designed. The bridge's structure consisted of a steel bowstring girder construction with a span of  pivoting on a central pier. It was named for Michael Davitt, 19th Century Irish social campaigner, Fenian, and founder of the National Land League. Davitt officially opened the bridge in 1887.

The 1887 bridge was designed for horse-drawn traffic and deteriorated with the advent of heavier motorized traffic in the 1900s. In 1947 the Mayo County Council planned to demolish and replace the bridge. J & C McGloughlin of Dublin undertook the construction, which was the largest bridge construction project by an Irish company at the time. It was completed in early 1949.

By 2007 the bridge had a number of problems with its swing mechanism, which hindered boat traffic. A review of its structures indicated corrosion and the Mayo County Council gave its backing to provide a new swing bridge.  Its new design by Malachy Walsh & Partners was based on a Spanish Calatrava architectural model. SIAC Construction undertook the work and it was opened in 2008. The finished bridge weighs 390 tonnes, but is still operated manually.

In November 2010, the bridge failed to close for over 2 hours, which resulted in a traffic snarl. The Mayo County Council ordered the bridge consultants and contractors to investigate this failure. The senior engineer, Michael Mongan, said minor modifications were put in place to resolve the issues. The bridge recommenced operations on a trial basis with the bridge back in full operation by the end of March 2011.

On 3 September 2017, the bridge celebrated its 130th anniversary.

References

External links

Bridges of Dublin: Michael Davitt Bridge (2003), Achill Island, Mayo
The Irish Times, New Bridge at Achill to open this week, 29 October 2008.
Discover Mayo: The Michael Davitt Bridge, Achill Island in Co. Mayo

Bridges in the Republic of Ireland
Bridges completed in 1887
Buildings and structures in County Mayo
Swing bridges
Achill Island